Botswana Power Corporation (BPC) is a state-owned company for electrical power generation, transmission and distribution in Botswana. It was established in 1970 and is currently the only electricity supplier in the country.  BPC represents Botswana in the Southern African Power Pool. Morupule Power Station (coal-fired) in Palapye supplies 80% of domestically generated electricity, however the country is dependent on importing energy from its neighbours. Its capacity is estimated to be around 132 MW. The region's main power supplier, South Africa, is experiencing its own problems with under-capacity blackouts. A plan to boost Morupule station with four new 150 MW units is underway and gathering financial support from several sources.

History 
Botswana Power Corporation was formed in 1970 after the Botswana Parliament passed the Botswana Power Corporation Act. BPC produced an estimated 1,052 GWh in 2007, while demand was estimated to 2,648 GWh.

Capacity 
Total electricity produced locally by BPC;

See also 

Botswana Power Corporation Workers' Union
Water Utilities Corporation
Botswana Communications Regulatory Authority

References

External links 

Government of Botswana
Electric power companies of Botswana
1970 establishments in Botswana
Botswana companies
Government agencies of Botswana